Balázs Dzsudzsák (born 23 December 1986) is a Hungarian professional footballer who plays for Nemzeti Bajnokság I club Debreceni VSC.

Dzsudzsák began his career at his hometown club Debreceni VSC, winning consecutive league titles in each of his three seasons before departing to PSV of the Netherlands in January 2008, ending the season with the Eredivisie title. He joined Dynamo Moscow in 2012 after a brief spell at Anzhi Makhachkala, before joining Turkish side Bursaspor in 2015 and Emirati club Al Wahda FC a year later.

Dzsudzsák made his full international debut for Hungary in 2007, and since earned 109 caps. He captained the side at UEFA Euro 2016. On 20 November 2022, he set the record of most appearances in the national team.

Club career

Early career
Dzsudzsák, who has Polish roots, was born in Debrecen but grew up in Nyírlugos. He started at Nyíradony Focisuli and was signed by Debreceni Olasz Focisuli, a football academy for young talents and was a sure way towards Debreceni VSC. In 2004, he played for Létavértes on loan from Debrecen in Nemzeti Bajnokság III, the Hungarian third division.

Debrecen
Dzsudzsák made his debut in the Hungarian National Championship I in 2004. He played twice during his first season with Debrecen. In his second season, he played ten matches and scored two goals. In the following two seasons, he became a permanent member of the squad, playing 36 matches and scoring 12 goals. He won the Hungarian National Championship I three times, in 2005, 2006 and 2007 and the Hungarian Super Cup three times, in 2005, 2006 and 2007.

PSV Eindhoven

On 24 October 2007, Dzsudzsák joined Dutch side PSV, signing a five-year contract. The left winger was originally to make his transfer to PSV in the summer of 2008, although the departure of Kenneth Perez from the PSV squad prompted PSV to speed up his transfer to January 2008. PSV scout Piet de Visser stated that Dzsudzsák "is an incredible talent. He is fast, good in the combination, can pass his man and give a good cross. You don't see them like this very often anymore. He is a modern left-winger".

Dzsudzsák made his Eredivisie debut on 12 January 2008, a 1–0 win against Feyenoord; Dzsudzsák was in the starting XI in the match and recorded three shots on goal. On the next matchday, he scored his first league goal in a 1–1 draw with VVV-Venlo. Dzsudzsák recorded his first assist on 23 January 2008 in a 3–1 win against Sparta Rotterdam. He managed to score five league goals in his first season, helping PSV win the Eredivisie title.

The 2008–09 season saw a new team coach arrive in Huub Stevens. Dzsudzsák scored his first hat-trick in a 6–0 victory against ADO Den Haag at the Philips Stadion on 5 February 2009 in the Eredivisie. He played a total of 32 league matches during the season, scoring 11 goals and 9 assists.

In the 2009–10 season, Fred Rutten took over the team. Dzsudzsák was named Man of the Match in a 4–3 victory over archrivals Ajax on matchday 3 of the Eredivisie, on 15 August 2009. Dzsudzsák scored two goals and one assist in the match. Dzsudzsák finished the 2009–10 season with 14 goals and 16 assists. In a UEFA Europa League match against Hamburger SV, Dzsudzsák was shown a straight red card by English referee Mike Dean after the player pushed the match official.

In 2010–11, Dzsudzsák had his best season yet for PSV and his career, as he scored 16 goals and provided 12 assists, finishing fourth and fifth in the Eredivisie respectively; he also scored 7 goals in 13 matches in European competitions for a total of 24 goals in 49 games. In 2011, Dzsudzsák signed an extension to his contract with PSV. Although he extended his contract at PSV, there was still interest from other clubs, including Russian side Anzhi Makhachkala.

Anzhi Makhachkala
On 12 June 2011, Dzsudzsák was transferred to Russian Premier League club Anzhi Makhachkala for an undisclosed fee, signing a four-year contract. "I am very happy to become part of an ambitious project at Anzhi," he said. "It is a big step forward in my career. I am eagerly looking forward to getting on the pitch with my new team-mates Roberto Carlos, Samuel Eto'o, Mbark Boussoufa, Diego Tardelli and others. I have heard a lot about the fantastic atmosphere at home games in Makhachkala." He made his Anzhi debut on 6 August against Tom Tomsk in a 2–0 victory. Dzsudzsák made eight appearances for Anzhi, mostly as a substitute. On 27 August 2011, in a match against, Rostov, he suffered a broken collar bone after a collision with an opponent, which kept him sidelined for the remainder of the season.

Dynamo Moscow

On 12 January 2012, Dzsudzsák was transferred to Dynamo Moscow, after the capital club paid the minimum release fee of €19 million, making Dzsudzsák the most expensive Hungarian player ever. He made his Dynamo debut on 9 March 2012 against CSKA Moscow, setting up a goal in 75th minute to help ensure a 1–1 draw.

2012–13 season

On 19 August 2012, Dzsudzsák scored his first league goal for Dynamo Moscow in the 75th minute against Terek Grozny in the 2012–13 Russian Premier League season. On the next matchday, on 25 August 2012, he played his most productive game in Russia at that point, scoring a goal and providing assists for two more in 3–2 victory over Lokomotiv Moscow.

On 30 September 2012, he scored in the Moscow derby against CSKA Moscow at the Arena Khimki in the 38th minute; the match ended in a 2–0 victory for Dynamo. Dzsudzsák also scored in a home 3–0 victory over Rubin Kazan at the Arena Khimki in the 30th minute, on 1 December 2012.

On 7 February 2013, it was revealed that Liverpool failed to sign Dzsudzsák, a target of Liverpool manager Brendan Rodgers, during the January transfer. According to József Vörösbarányi, Dzsdzsák's agent, Dynamo was not interested in selling him.

On 5 May 2013, Dzsudzsák scored his last goal in the 2012–13 Russian Premier League season against Krylya Sovetov Samara at the Stadion Metalurh in the fifth minute in a 2–1 victory.

On 17 June 2013, Sky Sports published an article on Dzsudzsák's possible move to Liverpool or Inter Milan. József Vörösbarányi claimed that both Liverpool and Inter were among those clubs interested in Dzsudzsák. Dzsudzsák, however, did not tell his willingness to leave the club since he felt "good" at Dynamo and had an excellent relationship with his coach, Dan Petrescu, at the time.

2013–14 season
The 2013–14 Russian Premier League season was the least productive for Dzsudzsák since he scored only one goal on 24 August 2013 against Zenit Saint Petersburg at the Arena Khimki in the 64th minute.

2014–15 season

On 16 October 2014, it was revealed that Dynamo Moscow are planning to offer to extend Dzsudzsák's contract. At the time, Dzsudzsák earned €2.6 million, but the club was willing to raise his salary to €3.2 million. This means that Dzsudzsák would be able to earn 2.7 million HUF/daily.

Although Dzsudzsák scored a goal in the 50th minute against Lokomotiv Moscow in the Moscow derby, Dynamo lost the match 4–2 on 2 November 2014 in the 2014–15 Russian Premier League season. On the 17th matchday of the Premier League season, Dzsudzsák scored a goal and gave two assists against Amkar Perm at the Arena Khimki.

On 10 December 2014, before the final match of the 2014–15 Europa League group stage match against his former club PSV, Dzsudzsák was honoured by his former club by displaying his footprint at the museum of the club.

On 19 December 2014, Dzsudzsák was awarded the best Hungarian football player of the year 2014 by the journalist of the Hungarian sport journal, nb1.hu. Dzsudzsák finished first (receiving 111 points), while Roland Juhász (92 points) second and Zoltán Gera third (44 points).

On 23 December 2014, Itasportpress.it revealed that Bundesliga club Borussia Dortmund showed interest in signing Dzsudzsák due to the possible financial problems of the Russian Premier League clubs including Dynamo Moscow. Previously, Dzsudzsák was linked with Serie A club Lazio and English Premier League clubs, including Liverpool and Everton.

On 15 January 2015, Dzsudzsák was linked again with Lazio.

On 9 April 2015, Dzsudzsák scored a superb goal in the 24th minute against CSKA Moscow in the 2014–15 Russian Premier League season at the Arena Khimki in Moscow. The Moscow derby ended with a 2–1 victory of Dynamo Moscow. After the match Dzsudzsák said "we consider this victory as if we had won the final".

Bursaspor
On 16 August 2015, Dzsudzsák signed for Bursaspor for €1.6 million. On 12 September, he scored his first and second Bursaspor goal, on matchday 4 of the 2015–16 Süper Lig against Gençlerbirliği at Bursa Atatürk Stadium.

Al Wahda
On 29 March 2018, he played as Al Wahba won the Arabian Gulf Cup 2–1 against Al Wasl.

Return to Debrecen 
On 22 September 2020, he was signed by his former club Debreceni VSC. Due to the relegation to the Nemzeti Bajnokság II of Debrecen, Dzsudzsák can play his first return match in the 2020–21 Nemzeti Bajnokság II season.
On 6 March 2021, he scored his first goal in the Nemzeti Bajnokság II against Kaposvári Rákóczi FC on the 28th game week of the 2020–21 Nemzeti Bajnokság II season at the Nagyerdei Stadion. On 1 July 2022, he signed a one-year contract with Debrecen.

International career

Dzsudzsák made his Hungary debut on 2 June 2007 in Heraklion against Greece. His first international goal came on 24 May 2008, incidentally in a match against Greece again. His fourth goal was a 94th-minute winner against Finland on 12 October 2010. Dzsudzsák scored his fifth goal against Lithuania in a friendly match in the Stadion Sóstói. He has scored three of his goals in the final three games in 2010, two of which were UEFA Euro qualifiers. Dzsudzsák scored the third goal of the four goals against Iceland at the Puskás Ferenc Stadium. The match finished 4–0. On 10 September 2013, Dzsudzsák scored his a goal wearing the national team's shirt in a 5–1 victory over Estonia in the 2014 FIFA World Cup qualification match at the Puskás Ferenc Stadium.

On 11 October 2013, Hungary suffered an 8–1 record defeat at the Amsterdam Arena against the Netherlands; Dzsudzsák scored the only Hungarian goal.

On 22 May 2014, Hungary hosted Denmark at the newly built Nagyerdei Stadion in Debrecen. The match's first goal was scored for Hungary by Dzsudzsák; the final result was 2–2.

On 11 October 2014, Hungary drew with Romania at the Arena Națională, Bucharest, in a UEFA Euro 2016 qualifying match; the equaliser was scored by Dzsudzsák. On 31 May 2016, Dzsudzsak was selected for Hungary's Euro 2016 squad as team captain.

On 14 June 2016, he played in the first group match in a 2–0 victory over Austria in Hungary's Group F match at the Nouveau Stade de Bordeaux in Bordeaux. Three days later, on 18 June, he played in a 1–1 draw against Iceland at the Stade Vélodrome, Marseille. Dzsudzsák also played in the last group stage match in a 3–3 draw against Portugal at the Parc Olympique Lyonnais in Lyon, on 22 June; he scored Hungary's second and third goal, thus helping his side in finishing at the top of group F.

On 20 November 2022, he played his last match wearing the national team's shirt against Greece. The match ended with a 2–1 victory for Hungary. After the winning match he thanked the football fans for their support and watching his farewell match. He then partied with Hungarian musician, Kis Grófo.

Outside football

Personal life
In 2010, it was revealed that Dzsudzsák was dating Hungarian model and socialite Linda Zimány.

Charity
Dzsudzsák offered €1,000 to the tournament Összefogás napja, which tributes to players who died young, including Miklós Fehér and Gábor Zavadszky.

Dzsudzsák, along with Hungarian international Roland Juhász, offered HUF 1 million each to the victims of the Ajka alumina plant accident.

On 13 April 2013, Dzsudzsák offered a HUF 3 million-worth medical device to the fund Szemem Fénye Alapítvány.

In September 2014, as captain of the Hungary national team, he and Roland Juhász decided, along with other Hungary teammates, to pay the tickets for about 1,200 fans for the away match against Romania.

Sponsorship
On 26 July 2013, EA Sports announced that they would feature Dzsudzsák on the Hungarian cover of FIFA 14, alongside global cover star Lionel Messi.

Career statistics

Club

International
.

Scores and results list Hungary's goal tally first, score column indicates score after each Dzsudzsák goal.

Honours
Debrecen
Hungarian League: 2004–05, 2005–06, 2006–07
Hungarian Cup: 2007–08
Hungarian Super Cup: 2005, 2006, 2007
Hungarian Second Division: 2020–21

PSV
Eredivisie: 2007–08
Johan Cruijff Shield: 2008

Al Wahda
UAE President's Cup: 2016–17
UAE League Cup: 2017–18
UAE Super Cup: 2017, 2018

Individual
 Hungarian Football Federation Player of the Year: 2010
 Hungarian Footballer of the Year (Golden Ball): 2010, 2014
 Megyei Príma: 2015

Records
 Most assists in the Eredivisie: 2009–10 (16 assists)

See also

List of footballers with 100 or more caps

References

External links

  
 

1986 births
Living people
Hungarian people of Polish descent
Sportspeople from Debrecen
Hungarian footballers
Hungarian expatriate footballers
Hungary international footballers
Hungary youth international footballers
Association football midfielders
Debreceni VSC players
Létavértes SC players
PSV Eindhoven players
FC Anzhi Makhachkala players
FC Dynamo Moscow players
Bursaspor footballers
Al Wahda FC players
Al-Ittihad Kalba SC players
Al Ain FC players
Nemzeti Bajnokság I players
Eredivisie players
Russian Premier League players
Süper Lig players
UAE Pro League players
Expatriate footballers in the Netherlands
Hungarian expatriate sportspeople in the Netherlands
Expatriate footballers in Russia
Hungarian expatriate sportspeople in Russia
Expatriate footballers in Turkey
Hungarian expatriate sportspeople in Turkey
Expatriate footballers in the United Arab Emirates
Hungarian expatriate sportspeople in the United Arab Emirates
UEFA Euro 2016 players
FIFA Century Club